The viola de buriti is a Brazilian stringed instrument made from the buriti palm tree. It is very lightweight, has four nylon strings and a tiny sound board and is fretless. It is found in the region of Jalapão in Tocantins and in northwest Minas Gerais.

The viola de buriti was one of the instruments featured in Brazil's Voa Viola Festival, which featured the diverse uses of the guitar in Brazilian music.

References

Brazilian musical instruments